Michael Rackl (31 October 1883 – 5 May 1948) was Roman Catholic Bishop of Eichstätt from 1935 until his death in 1948.

He was born in Rittershof on 31 October 1883, the son of a wealthy farmer. He was the eldest of nine children, of which three were also religious. He graduated in 1904 and studied theology and philosophy at the Eichstätter Lyceum, graduating from the University of Freiburg in 1911 with a doctorate in dogmatics. Rackl was ordained a priest on 29 June 1909 at the age of 25 in Eichstätt by Cardinal Konrad von Preysing.

On 4 November 1935, aged 52, Rackl was appointed Bishop of Eichstätt, where he remained until his death at age 64 on 21 December 1935. During the Second World War, Rackl allowed British Officers in a local prisoner-of-war camp to use the Bishopric's printing press to produce a camp magazine entitled "Touchstone", which was notable for including three ghost stories by Alan Noel Latimer Munby.

In 1933, he signed the Vow of allegiance of the Professors of the German Universities and High-Schools to Adolf Hitler and the National Socialistic State. He was a priest for almost 39 years and a bishop for 12 years.

In 1936, Rackl declared that Catholicism and National Socialism were incompatible, having been at odds with the Nazis since his inauguration as bishop the year before. In April 1937, he defended a priest, Johann Kraus, who had been ordered to leave Eichstätt by the Nazis.

References

External links
Catholic Hierarchy

1883 births
1948 deaths
People from the Rhine Province
Roman Catholic bishops of Eichstätt
20th-century German Roman Catholic bishops
20th-century German Roman Catholic priests